de Courcy Ireland (1 August 1873 – 28 January 1915) was an Irish first-class cricketer and British Indian Army officer.

The son of William de Courcy Ireland, a civil servant, he was born on 1 August 1873 on Henzada in British Burma. He was educated in both Ireland and Germany, before attending the Royal Military College, Sandhurst from which he graduated into the Royal Fusiliers as a second lieutenant December 1892. He transferred to the Indian Staff Corps in July 1897, at which point he was promoted to lieutenant. He took part in the 1897 Tirah campaign against the revolting Afridi tribe in the North-West Frontier Province. In September of the same year, Ireland made a single appearance in first-class cricket for the Europeans cricket team against the Parsees at Poona in the 1897/98 Bombay Presidency Match. Batting twice in the match, he was dismissed for 8 runs by Nasarvanji Bapasola in the Europeans first innings, while in their second innings he was not out on 7, despite having come into bat at number four. Later serving with the 36th Sikhs, he was promoted to major in December 1910, having been made a captain prior to this. He married Gabrielle Bryan in December 1910, with the couple residing in England at Buckfastleigh, Devon. Their son, John de Courcy Ireland, would become a renowned maritime historian. He was posted to the Republic of China in June 1914, where he stationed at the onset of the First World War. Ireland died from fever in January 1915 at either British Hong Kong or Peking.

References

External links

1873 births
1915 deaths
Graduates of the Royal Military College, Sandhurst
Royal Fusiliers officers
British Indian Army officers
British military personnel of the Tirah campaign
Irish cricketers
Europeans cricketers
Indian Army personnel killed in World War I
Disease-related deaths in Hong Kong
British people in British Burma
British people in colonial India